Dulapally is a village located in Medchel district.  It falls under Quthbullapur mandal.

Transport
The buses run by APSRTC connect it to different parts of the city.
227 Bus from Secunderabad to Bahadurpally.

References

Villages in Ranga Reddy district